Coleophora albilineella is a moth of the family Coleophoridae. It is found in Spain, France, Sardinia, Austria, the Czech Republic, Slovakia, Hungary, Romania, Greece and southern Russia.

References

albilineella
Moths described in 1960
Moths of Europe